Zygaenosia immaculata is a moth in the subfamily Arctiinae. It was described by Rothschild and Jordan in 1901. It is found in Papua New Guinea.

References

Nudariina
Moths described in 1901
Zygaenosia